The First Secretary of the Tatarstan regional branch of the Communist Party of the Soviet Union was the position of highest authority in the Tatar ASSR in the Russian SFSR of the Soviet Union. The position was created in 1920, and abolished in August 1991. The First Secretary was a de facto appointed position usually by the Politburo or the General Secretary himself.

List of First Secretaries of the Communist Party of Tatarstan

See also
Tatar Autonomous Soviet Socialist Republic

Notes

Sources
 World Statesmen.org

1920 establishments in Russia
1991 disestablishments in the Soviet Union
Regional Committees of the Communist Party of the Soviet Union
Politics of Tatarstan